Stella Days is a 2011 film directed by Thaddeus O'Sullivan and starring Martin Sheen as a Roman Catholic priest in rural Ireland during the mid-1950s.

The film is based on the book Stella Days: The Life and Times of a Rural Irish Cinema, written by Michael Doorley, which concerns the true story of how a small cinema came into being in the town of  Borrisokane in County Tipperary. Filming took place in the town of Fethard rather than Borrisokane. The film was screened in front of an invited audience in the Clarke Memorial Hall, Borrisokane on 24 March 2012.

References

External links
 
 
 Stella Days at YouTube

2011 films
2011 drama films
Films shot in Ireland
Films about Catholicism
Films about Christianity
Films about Catholic priests
Films scored by Nicholas Hooper
Borrisokane
Irish drama films
2010s English-language films